Robert Lee Minor or Bob Lee Minor (born January 1, 1944) is an American stunt performer, television and film actor, best known for doubling many African-American celebrities such as: Jim Brown, Fred Williamson, Bernie Mac, Danny Glover, Carl Weathers, Roger E. Mosley and John Amos. Minor was born in Birmingham, Alabama, and made his first television appearance in 1973 on the television program, Search, then appeared in tons of shows such as: McCloud, Barnaby Jones, The Six Million Dollar Man, Wonder Woman, Eight is Enough, Magnum, P.I. and Starsky and Hutch among other popular television programs.

Filmography

Stunt Performing
Here is a list of stunt performances Bob Minor has done:
 Beyond the Valley of the Dolls (1970)
 Blacula (1972)
 Hammer (1972)
 Come Back, Charleston Blue (1972)
 Black Gunn (1972)
 Black Caesar (1973)
 Live and Let Die (1973)
 Cleopatra Jones (1973)
 Detroit 9000 (1973)
 That Man Bolt (1973)
 Hell Up in Harlem (1973)
 Three the Hard Way (1974)
 Rollerball (1975) .... Rollerball Team Member (uncredited)
 Posse (1993) (as stunt coordinator/Second Unit Director)

Actor

 The Legend of Nigger Charley (1972) .... Fred
 Sweet Jesus, Preacherman (1973) .... Hotel target (uncredited)
 Coffy (1973) .... Studs
 Scream Blacula Scream (1973) .... Pimp #1
 Detroit 9000 (1973) .... Killer (uncredited)
 Three Tough Guys (1974) .... Hood (uncredited)
 Foxy Brown (1974) .... Oscar
 Black Eye (1974) .... Henchman
 Dirty Mary, Crazy Larry (1974) .... Deputy #5
 The Swinging Cheerleaders (1974) .... Ryan
 Black Samson (1974) .... Samson's Street People
 Carnal Madness (1975) .... Dick Peters
 Switchblade Sisters (1975) .... Parker
 Rollerball (1975) .... Rollerball Team Member (uncredited)
 Hard Times (1975) .... Zack
 Dr. Black, Mr. Hyde (1976) .... Security Guard
 Swashbuckler (1976) .... Pirate (uncredited)
 Drum (1976) .... Cuban Slave
 J. D.'s Revenge (1976) .... Husband
 The Next Man (1976) .... Killer – Bahamas (uncredited)
 Mr. Billion (1977) .... Black Kidnapper
 The Deep (1977) .... Wiley
 The Choirboys (1977) .... Hod carrier 2
 The Driver (1978) .... Green Mask
 Death Dimension (1978) .... Tatoupa
 Norma Rae (1979) .... Lucius White
 Skatetown, U.S.A. (1979)
 Angel City (1980) .... Jabbo
 Escape from New York (1981) .... Duty Sergeant
 Rocky III (1982) .... Challenger #1
 White Dog (1982) .... Joe
 Forced Vengeance (1982) .... LeRoy Nicely
 The Sting II (1983) .... Tony Savitt
 Heart Like a Wheel (1983) .... Ralph, NHRA Official
 Women of San Quentin (1983) .... J.W. Powers
 Commando (1985) .... Private Jackson
 Hamburger: The Motion Picture (1986) .... Officer Rigney
 Bad Guys (1986) .... Biker in Bar (uncredited)
 The Morning After (1986) .... Man
 Project X (1987) .... Air Policeman
 Action Jackson (1988) .... Gamble
 Torch Song Trilogy (1988) .... Gregory
 L.A. Bounty (1989) .... Martin
 Catch Me If You Can (1989) .... Sandman
 Glory (1989) .... Contraband Soldier
 Almost an Angel (1990) .... Joe – Moses Bros. Truck Driver
 Aces: Iron Eagle III (1992) .... Bigman
 Unlawful Entry (1992) .... Detective Murray
 Innocent Blood (1992) .... Bus Driver
 Love Field (1992) .... Barricade Policeman
 Posse (1993) .... Alex
 Extreme Justice (1993) .... Art Blake
 Surviving the Game (1994) .... Security Guard
 Beverly Hills Cop III (1994) .... Security Guard in Printing Room (uncredited)
 Assassins (1995) .... Cop
 Rage (1995) .... Kelly's Man (uncredited)
 The Sunchaser (1996) .... Deputy Lynch
 Judge and Jury (1996) .... Biker #1
 The Replacement Killers (1998) .... Cop Arresting Meg (uncredited)
 The Gingerbread Man (1998) .... Mr. Pitney
 Light It Up (1999) .... Lester's Dad
 Ground Zero (2000) .... Muller
 The Beat (2003) .... Robbery Victim (uncredited)
 Death at a Funeral'' (2010) .... Edward

External links
 

1944 births
African-American male actors
American male film actors
American stunt performers
American male television actors
Male actors from Birmingham, Alabama
Living people
21st-century African-American people
20th-century African-American people